Delias geraldina is a butterfly in the family Pieridae. It was described by Henley Grose-Smith in 1894. It is found in the Australasian realm where it is endemic to New Guinea.

Subspecies
D. g. geraldina (Central Highlands, Papua New Guinea)
D. g. emilia Rothschild & Jordan, 1904 Oetakwa River, Irian Jaya
D. g. masakoae Nakano, 1998 (Bintang, Kec Okbibab, Irian Jaya)
D. g. onin Yagishita, 2003 (Fakfak, Irian Jaya)
D. g. siderea Roepke, 1955 (Wamena, Irian Jaya)
D. g. vaneechoudi Roepke, 1955 (Weyland Mountains & Paniai, Irian Jaya)
D. g. vogelcopensis Yagishita, 1993 (Arfak & Wandammen Mountains, Irian Jaya)

References

External links
Delias at Markku Savela's Lepidoptera and Some Other Life Forms

geraldina
Butterflies described in 1894
Endemic fauna of New Guinea